The Milk Bottle Grocery, located at 2426 N. Classen Boulevard in Oklahoma City, Oklahoma, is a grocery building with a large metal Braum's milk bottle atop its roof. The store was constructed in 1930, and the milk bottle was added in 1948. The bottle was designed to draw attention to the store, as the tall bottle would be visible to automobile traffic along Classen Boulevard, which was part of U.S. Route 66 at the time; it also served as an advertisement for the dairy industry. The store is also one of the few triangular buildings in Oklahoma City, as it occupies a corner lot in an area where Classen Boulevard cuts diagonally through the city's street grid. Due to its shape, the store was known as the Triangle Grocery from 1940 until 1948, when it became the Milk Bottle Grocery due to its new statue.

The building was added to the National Register of Historic Places on March 5, 1998. The Saigon Baguette, a Vietnamese  shop, occupied the space for several years. In August 2014 it was announced that the building would be restored to its original appearance.

See also
 Benewah Milk Bottle
 Guaranteed Pure Milk bottle
 Hood Milk Bottle
 The Bottle, Alabama

References

External links
 

Commercial buildings on the National Register of Historic Places in Oklahoma
Buildings and structures in Oklahoma City
Commercial buildings completed in 1930
Buildings and structures on U.S. Route 66
U.S. Route 66 in Oklahoma
Restaurants in Oklahoma
Bottles
Novelty buildings in Oklahoma
Milk in culture
National Register of Historic Places in Oklahoma City
1930 establishments in Oklahoma
Grocery store buildings